The Trans-Atlantic Fan Fund, often known as TAFF, is a crowdfunding project created in 1953 for the purpose of providing funds to bring well-known and popular members of science fiction fandom familiar to fans on both sides of the ocean, across the Atlantic.

History

The first international fan fund, the Big Pond Fund, was established to get Ted Carnell to the 1947 Worldcon, though it was the 1949 Worldcon he eventually attended. TAFF's roots lie in the successful effort to bring Walt Willis to the 1952 Worldcon in Chicago. Willis published the founding document for TAFF in Hyphen 4 (October 1953) following a discussion with "the available leaders of British fandom" at that year's Coroncon. Since that time TAFF has regularly brought North American fans to European conventions and European fans to North American conventions. The success of TAFF has inspired other regular fan funds between North America and Australia, Europe and Australia, and even Eastern and Western Canada.

Funding

TAFF is funded through the support of fandom. Candidates are voted on by interested fans all over the world, and each vote is accompanied by a donation of not less than $4 or £3 or €4. These donations, and the continued generosity of fandom, are what make TAFF possible.

In addition to donations, fans hold auctions at science fiction conventions to raise money for TAFF.  Frequently art, books, T-shirts, and other ephemera of fandom are auctioned off for this purpose.

Procedure

Each candidate posts a bond, promising to travel (if elected) to a major convention on the other side of the Atlantic; and has provided signed nominations and a platform.

Voting is by secret ballot, using instant-runoff voting; and is open to anyone who has been active in fandom for the prior year or more and who contributes to the Fund. Ballots are signed, to prevent ballot-box stuffing and to enable the election administrators to identify each voter as a known member of fandom.

Although the winner is expected to attend Worldcon or a specific national convention, TAFF delegates generally also tour the country before and/or after the convention in order to meet a variety of fans.

Winning TAFF candidates are expected to write a trip report, which customarily takes the form of a fanzine or a series of fanzine articles. These fanzines are sometimes sold in order to help raise funds towards future TAFF trips. In addition, winners take over the administration of the fund for their region (Europe or North America) until the next regional TAFF delegate is selected (usually a period of two years, unless the next race is delayed).  At any given time, there are at least two administrators, one for each region.

List of TAFF winners
Past TAFF winners by year. 
Westbound races are marked << and eastbound >>.

	1952	<<	Walt Willis
	1954	<<	Vin¢ Clarke
	1955	<<	Ken Bulmer
	1956	>>	Lee Hoffman
	1957	>>	Robert A Madle
	1958	<<	Ron Bennett
	1959	>>	Don Ford
	1960	<<	Eric Bentcliffe
	1961	>>	Ron Ellik
	1962	<<	Ethel Lindsay
	1963	>>	Wally Weber
	1964	<<	Arthur Thomson ("Atom")
	1965	>>	Terry Carr
	1966	<<	Thomas Schlück
	1968	>>	Steve Stiles
	1969	<<	Eddie Jones
	1970	>>	Elliot K Shorter	
	1971	<<	Mario Bosnyak
	1973	>>	Len & June Moffatt	
	1974	<<	Peter Weston	
	1976	>>	Bill Bowers & Roy Tackett	(tie)
	1977	<<	Peter Roberts	
	1979	>>	Terry Hughes	
	1980	<<	Dave Langford
	1981	>>	Stu Shiffman
	1982	<<	Kevin Smith	
	1983	>>	Avedon Carol	
	1984	<<	Rob Hansen
	1985	>>	Patrick Nielsen Hayden & Teresa Nielsen Hayden	
	1986	<<	Greg Pickersgill	
	1987	>>	Jeanne Gomoll
	1988	<<	Lilian Edwards & Christina Lake	
	1989	>>	Robert Lichtman	
	1991	<<	Pam Wells
	1992	>>	Jeanne Bowman
	1993	<<	Abigail Frost	
	1995	>>	Dan Steffan	
	1996	<<	Martin Tudor	
	1998	>>	Ulrika O'Brien	
	1998	<<	Maureen Kincaid Speller	
	1999	>>	Velma J Bowen ("Vijay")	
	2000	<<	Sue Mason	
	2001	>>	Victor M. Gonzalez	
	2002	<<	Tobes Valois
	2003	>>	Randy Byers	
	2004	<<	James Bacon	
	2005	>>	Suzanne Tompkins ("Suzle")	
	2006	<<	Bridget Bradshaw ("Bug")	
   2008	>>	Christopher J Garcia
   2009    <<  Steve Green
   2010    >>  Anne KG Murphy & Brian Gray (joint) 
   2011    <<  John Coxon 
   2012    >>  Jacqueline Monahan
	2013	<<	Jim Mowatt
	2014	>>	Curt Phillips
	2015	<<	Nina Horvath	
	2016	<<	Anna Raftery
	2017	>>	John Purcell	
	2018	<<	Johan Anglemark
   2019    >>  Geri Sullivan
   2020    >>  Michael J. "Orange Mike" Lowrey
   2022    <<  Sofia "Fia" Karlsson

There were no TAFF races in 1953, 1967, 1972, 1975, 1978, 1990, 1994, and 1997.

The second 1998 race was announced to "catch up" after the lack of a 1997 race.

The 2007 race between Chris Garcia and Mary Kay Kare was cancelled due to the cancellation of the 2007 Eastercon; Garcia stood again in 2008 and won.

The direction of the 2016 race was switched by the administrators (Nina Horvath, Jim Mowatt and Curt Phillips) to align with the 2017 Worldcon being held in Helsinki, Finland, and the likelihood of the 2019 Worldcon being held in Dublin, Ireland. 

The race for 2020 was again east-bound, and was to send a North American TAFF delegate to the 2020 Eastercon and Swecon. Due to the COVID-19 pandemic and attendant travel restrictions, the 2020 winner started his trip in April of 2022, beginning with the 2022 Eurocon in Luxembourg and continuing with the 2022 Eastercon ["Reclamation"]. 

There was no 2021 TAFF race.

See also
Down Under Fan Fund (DUFF)

References

External links 
TAFF website (unofficial but comprehensive)
Fan Funds website
Shockwave Radio Theater podcast Interview with 2006 TAFF winner Bridget Bradshaw

Science fiction fandom
Science fiction organizations
Crowdfunding